Dahaneh-ye Akhlamad (also known as Akhlamad, Akhtamand, Dahanehé Akhlemad, and Dahaneh-ye Akhlūmad) is a village in Chenaran Rural District, in the Central District of Chenaran County, Razavi Khorasan Province, Iran. At the 2006 census, its population was 565, in 153 families.

References 

Populated places in Chenaran County